John Patrick Hemingway (born August 19, 1960) is a Canadian-American author, whose memoir Strange Tribe: A Family Memoir examines the similarities and the complex relationship between his father Gloria Hemingway and his grandfather, the Nobel Laureate Ernest Hemingway; in particular it addresses the issue of his father's cross-dressing and sex reassignment and its connection to Ernest Hemingway.

Hemingway moved to Milan, Italy in 1983, where he pursued a writing and translating career. His articles have appeared in several Italian newspapers such as l'Unità and Libero, and in American magazines and literary journals.

He has published the novel Bacchanalia: A Pamplona Story, inspired by his visits to the San Fermín festival, and has also prefaced the book Hemingway in Pamplona, by Miguel Izu.

Hemingway is currently working on a collection of short stories.

Personal life
As revealed in his memoir, Strange Tribe, Hemingway had a difficult childhood. His father suffered from bipolar disorder and his mother, Alice Thomas, is schizophrenic. Hemingway spent his early years being shuffled from one home to another, and dealing with his dysfunctional family. He eventually went to study history and Italian at U.C.L.A. and after graduating moved to Italy, as a way of distancing himself from his troubled family background. One of the unresolved questions for him was how his father, a cross-dresser and transsexual, could fit with the image that the public has of his grandfather as an icon of male masculinity.

After leaving Italy and spending a year in Spain  and three months  in the Medoc in France, Hemingway now lives with his wife, Kristina and his daughter Jacqueline in Montreal, Quebec, Canada.

References and footnotes

External links

 Personal blog
 WMFE-FM The Arts Connection radio program.
 The Diane Rehm Show radio interview

American expatriates in Canada
American expatriates in Italy
Place of birth missing (living people)
American expatriates in Spain
American male writers
1960 births
Living people
Hemingway family
Bull runners
Canterbury School (Connecticut) alumni